Seru is a town in southeastern Ethiopia.

Seru may also refer to:
Seru (name)
Seru (Dragon Ball) or Cell, a character in Dragon Ball media
Seru (Legend of Legaia), a race of creatures in the Legend of Legaia universe
Seru (woreda), in Ethiopia

See also
Serú Girán, an Argentine rock band
Cero (disambiguation)